Markovo Airport  is an airport located in Markovo, in the Chukotka autonomous district of Russia.  Starting in the 1940s, Markovo was one of eight stops on the backbone Aeroflot passenger route from Moscow to Anadyr.

Military history
By 1951, US intelligence reported that an airfield for Tupolev Tu-4 bombers was being constructed at Markovo.  However the Soviet Union chose instead to build several bomber staging bases along the northern coast, which could be better supplied by the Northern Sea Route.  US intelligence continued to monitor Markovo as a possible Tupolev Tu-22M (Backfire) staging base as late as 1980.

Airlines and destinations

References 

Airports built in the Soviet Union
Airports in Chukotka Autonomous Okrug